Nantou County legislative districts consist of 2 single-member constituencies, each represented by a member of the Republic of China Legislative Yuan.

Current districts
Nantou County Constituency 1 - Puli, Caotun, Zhongliao, Yuchi, Guoxing, Ren'ai Townships
Nantou County Constituency 2 - Nantou City, Mingjian, Jiji, Zhushan, Lugu, Shuili, Xinyi Townships

Legislators

 Wu Den-yih resigned in 2009 to take office as Premier of the Republic of China under the Ma administration.

 Lin Ming-chen resigned in 2015 after elected Nantou County magistrate.

Election results

2020

2016

References

Constituencies in Taiwan
Nantou County